The members of the fifth National Assembly of South Korea were elected on 29 June 1960. The assembly sat from 29 July 1960 until 16 May 1961.

House of Councillors

House of Representatives

Seoul

Gyeonggi

North Chungcheong

South Chungcheong

North Jeolla

South Jeolla

North Gyeongsang

South Gyeongsang

Gangwon

Jeju

Notes

See also 

 1960 South Korean parliamentary election
 National Assembly (South Korea)#History
 House of Councillors (South Korea)
 House of Representatives (South Korea)

References 

005
National Assembly members 005